Daniel Emile Mellet (8 June 1923 – 29 July 2017) was a Swiss football referee.

Refereeing career
In 1955, Mellet began refereeing in the Swiss Super League, the top flight of football in Switzerland. In 1959, he was appointed as a FIFA referee.

In 1964, Mellet was appointed as a referee for the 1964 European Nations' Cup, where he officiated the third place play-off between Hungary and Denmark. Mellet retired from refereeing in 1964.

References

External links
 Profile at worldfootball.net

1923 births
2017 deaths
Sportspeople from Lausanne
Swiss football referees
1964 European Nations' Cup referees